American Beauty Star is an American competition reality television series on Lifetime.

Cast

Season 1  
 Adriana Lima as Host
 Russell James as Judge
 Sarah Brown as Judge
 Sir John as Mentor
 Amanda Terry as Contestant
 Andrew Velazquez as Contestant
 Catherine Shim as Contestant
 Corey Ford as Contestant
 Danny Jelaca as Contestant
 Jenny Strebe as Contestant
 John Blaine as Contestant
 Kym Nicole Oubre as Contestant
 Mitchell Halliday as Contestant
 Sandy Poirier as Contestant
 Silvia Reis as Contestant
 Tyme The Infamous as Contestant

Sources:

Episodes

Season 1

Season 2

See also

 List of programs broadcast by Lifetime

References

External links
 
 American Beauty Star at IMDb
American Beauty Star at Lifetime

2010s American reality television series
Lifetime (TV network) original programming
2017 American television series debuts